Ann Veronica is a 1952 British TV version of the 1909 H. G. Wells novel of the same name.

It stars Margaret Lockwood. Lockwood was going to make a film version of this book in 1950 after Highly Dangerous. The project kept being delayed.

She made it after Trent's Last Case. She wrote "I had already developed a great liking for televised plays and this one was an interesting part."

The production was well received.

In 1964 the novel was adapted into a four-part BBC series Ann Veronica starring Rosemary Nicols.

References

External links

Ann Veronica at BFI
Review of production at Variety

1952 television plays
British television plays
Films based on works by H. G. Wells